Richard Taylor may refer to:

Entertainment
Richard Taylor (cartoonist) (1902–1970), Canadian cartoonist, The New Yorker magazine
Richard Norton-Taylor (born 1944), British editor, journalist, and playwright
Richard Taylor (British writer) (born 1967), writer and broadcaster
Richard Taylor (film director) (1933–2015), British documentary film director
Richard John Taylor (born 1985), British film editor, writer, and director
Richard Taylor (filmmaker) (born 1960s), head of Weta Workshop special effects studio
Richard Taylor (Hollyoaks), a character in UK soap opera Hollyoaks
Richard Taylor, former member of American rock band Gin Blossoms

Military
Richard Taylor (colonel) (1744–1829), father of U.S. president Zachary Taylor
Richard Taylor (Confederate general) (1826–1879), son of U.S. president Zachary Taylor, Confederate general in the American Civil War
Richard Taylor (Medal of Honor) (1834–1890), American Civil War soldier and Medal of Honor recipient
Richard H. Taylor (1870–1956), American Medal of Honor recipient
Richard Taylor (British Army officer) (1819–1904), British general
Richard R. Taylor (1922–1978), American lieutenant general and Surgeon General of the United States Army

Politics
Richard Taylor (by 1517–73 or later), MP for Haverfordwest
Richard Taylor (died 1641), English lawyer and politician who sat in the House of Commons from 1621 to 1629
Richard Taylor (Royalist) (1620–1667), of Clapham, Bedfordshire
Richard Taylor (died 1699), English MP for East Retford
Richard Taylor (British politician) (born 1934), Independent Kidderminster Member of Parliament
Richard Molesworth Taylor (1835–1919), New Zealand politician
Richard Taylor (Canadian politician) (1915–1991), Canadian politician in the Legislative Assembly of Ontario

Religion
Richard Taylor (missionary) (1805–1873), missionary in New Zealand
Richard Vickerman Taylor (1830–1914), English priest and historian
Richard S. Taylor (1912–2006), Nazarene theologian

Science 
Richard Taylor (editor) (1781–1858), English naturalist and publisher of scientific journals
Richard Cowling Taylor (1789–1851), English surveyor and geologist
Richard Taylor (philosopher) (1919–2003), American metaphysical philosopher and commercial beekeeper
Richard E. Taylor (1929–2018), Canadian laureate of the 1990 Nobel Prize in Physics
Richard Taylor (mathematician) (born 1962), involved in completing the proof of Fermat's last theorem

Sports
Dick Taylor (Australian rules footballer) (1901–1962), AFL player whose real name is Richard
Richard Taylor (Australian footballer) (born 1973), former Hawthorn and West Coast Eagles player in the AFL
Richard Taylor (footballer, born 1957), English footballer
Richard Taylor (footballer, born 2000), English footballer
Richard Taylor (American football) (born 1985), American football cornerback
Richard Taylor (cross-country skier) (born 1938), American cross-country skier
Richard Taylor (skater) (1981–2004), Welsh skater
Richard Mansfield Taylor, real name of Jeff Richards, American minor league baseball player and actor

Others
Richard Taylor (pirate) (fl. 1721), pirate captain also known as John Taylor

See also
Dick Taylor (disambiguation)